The University of Cundinamarca, is a public, departmental, coeducational university located primarily in the city of Fusagasugá in Cundinamarca, Colombia. The university has satellite campuses across the department in the cities of Chía, Chocontá, Facatativá, Girardot, Soacha, Ubaté and Zipaquirá.

See also

 List of universities in Colombia

References

External links
 University of Cundinamarca official site 
 Facebook

Universities and colleges in Colombia
University of Cundinamarca
Educational institutions established in 1969
1969 establishments in Colombia
Buildings and structures in Zipaquirá